Giovanna Epis (born 11 October 1988) is an Italian long-distance runner.

Biography
She competed at the 2018 IAAF World Half Marathon Championships. She was bronze medal with the Italian team at the 2019 European 10,000m Cup in London. In 2019, she competed in the women's marathon at the 2019 World Athletics Championships held in Doha, Qatar. She did not finish her race. She competed at the 2020 Summer Olympics, in Marathon.

On 7 April 2019, setting her personal best in the Rotterdam Marathon with a time of 2:29:11, she achieved the entry standard for the Tokyo 2020 Olympics, which was set at 2:29:30.

Progression
Marathon
The Epis in 2015 disputed her first marathon, managing to improve subsequently six times in succession.

Achievements

National titles
Epis won two national championships at individual senior level.

Italian Athletics Championships
Marathon: 2020
Half marathon: 2021

See also
 Italian team at the running events
 Italy at the 2018 European Athletics Championships
 Italy at the 2019 World Championships in Athletics

References

External links
 

Living people
1988 births
Athletics competitors of Centro Sportivo Carabinieri
Athletics competitors of Gruppo Sportivo Forestale
Italian female cross country runners
Italian female long-distance runners
Italian female marathon runners
Sportspeople from Venice
World Athletics Championships athletes for Italy
Athletes (track and field) at the 2020 Summer Olympics
Olympic athletes of Italy
21st-century Italian women
Athletes (track and field) at the 2022 Mediterranean Games
Mediterranean Games gold medalists in athletics
Mediterranean Games gold medalists for Italy